James Francis "Kid" O'Hara (December 19, 1875 – December 1, 1954) was an outfielder in Major League Baseball.

External links 

1875 births
1954 deaths
Baseball players from Pennsylvania
Sportspeople from Wilkes-Barre, Pennsylvania
Major League Baseball outfielders
Boston Beaneaters players
Troy Washerwomen players
Troy Trojans (minor league) players
Lawrence Colts players
Fall River Indians players
Georgetown Hoyas baseball coaches